Imperiumin vastaisku (The Empire Strikes Back) is the tenth album of Finnish musical group Eppu Normaali, published 23 June 1988.

Track listing
The album includes the following songs (original Finnish name followed by English translation):
 Afrikka, sarvikuonojen maa (Africa, the land of rhinoceri)
 Näin kulutan aikaa (This is how I spend time)
 Linnunradan laidalla (On the edge of the Milky Way)
 Baarikärpänen (Barfly)
 Kalkkiviivoilla (On the chalk lines)
 Osa luonnollista karsintaa (A part of natural selection)
 Samaan aikaan toisaalla (At the same time somewhere else)
 Keskiyön cowboy (Midnight Cowboy)
 Roudan rutinaa (Squeaking of frozen soil)

References

1988 albums
Eppu Normaali albums